The 2013–14 Oklahoma City Barons season is the franchise's fourth season in the American Hockey League, which began on October 4, 2013.

Off-season
Oklahoma City remained in the same division after an American Hockey League realignment in the summer of 2013, but it was renamed from the South Division to the West Division. Todd Nelson started his fourth year as Barons head coach in the 2013–14 season, despite rumors that he may depart following his disappointment with being passed over as the Edmonton Oilers coach after Ralph Krueger's departure. Nelson has two years remaining on his contract and said, but said he may explore job opportunities at other organizations in the future. The Barons saw several departures in the off-season, such as forwards Philippe Cornet, Darcy Hordichuk, Kristiāns Pelšs, and Chris VandeVelde; defensemen Randy Jones and Jordan Henry; and veteran goaltender Yann Danis. Center Mark Arcobello, an AHL-All Star and the team's all-time leading scorer, made the Edmonton roster. Winger Curtis Hamilton remained on the team, but injured his knee in a practice after the first game of the season and would not start right away. Newcomers to the team included forwards Travis Ewanyk, Matthew Ford, Austin Fyten, Ryan Hamilton, Ryan Jones, Kale Kessy, Philip Larsen, Andrew Miller, Nicholas Tremblay, and Derek Nesbitt; defensemen Martin Gernat, Brad Hunt, Oscar Klefbom and David Musil; and goaltender Richard Bachman, who was backup goal for NHL's Dallas Stars for the last two seasons. Winger Linus Omark, who had previously played for the Barons and Oilers but spent last season with the Swiss team EV Zug, returned to a one-year agreement with Oklahoma City. The new Oklahoma City roster included a mix of young and veteran forwards, as well as a young core of defensemen, with six of the starting eight between ages 20 and 22, as well as Hunt and Taylor Fedun, both of whom were 25.

After starting their training camp on September 23, the Barons lost both of their two preseason games in overtime, starting with a 3–2 loss to the Texas Stars on September 27. Gernat and Joel Broda scored for Oklahoma City, but forward Mike Heddenn got the game-winner 58 seconds into the extra period. The Barons lost a preseason game against the San Antonio Rampage on September 28, falling 2–1 after San Antonio center Jared Gomes tied the game with 12.9 seconds left in regulation, then scored the game's lone shootout goal against Oklahoma City goalie Ty Rimmer.

Regular season

October
The Barons started the season with three straight losses, including back-to-back defeats against the Charlotte Checkers, and a 1–0 shutout loss to Iowa Wild. Oklahoma City has lost all four home openers since the franchise began. The Barons were forced to make last-minute line changes when Ryan Hamilton was recalled to Edmonton just hours before the first game. Despite the losses, Bachman recorded a 2.36 goals against average and .920 game percentage over the first three games. Oklahoma City notched their first win of the season on October 13 with a 4–2 game against Iowa. Nesbitt had two goals, and the Barons scored two power play goals within 46 seconds in the third period. Iowa forward Jason Zucker received a 10-minute match penalty and two-game suspension for an illegal check to the head of Omark. Oklahoma defeated the Texas Stars on October 15 in their first home victory of the season. Omark, who had yet to score in the season thus far, scored the game-winner in overtime. The game brought the team's penalty kill percentage to 93.8, the second-best in the league at that point.

Over the next two weeks, the Oklahoma City roster underwent multiple changes due to repeated Edmonton Oilers injuries. Bachman, Ryan Jones, team captain Anton Lander and wingers Ben Eager, Tyler Pitlick were all recalled in that time, as were defensemen Fedun, Denis Grebeshkov and Corey Potter, who were returned to the Barons before the month was out. Center Ryan Martindale was also sidelined until mid-November due to arthroscopic knee surgery. Omark scored two goals and two assists in a 4–3 victory over the Abbotsford Heat on October 18, with Bachman making 41 saves, including 20 during a three-goal Heat rally in the final period. Two power play goals in that game brought the Barons' man advantage percentage to 28 percent, the third-best team in the league.

Abbotsford defeated Oklahoma City 2–1 the next day, forcing overtime after scoring with 38 seconds left in regulation. Miller failed to score on a penalty shot against goalie Reto Berra. Bachman, in his first shootout in two years, allowed two of four goals, while only Nesbitt scored for the Barons. Bachman nevertheless retained a 1.99 GAA and .934 save percentage. After five home games, the team's average attendance of about 2,600 marked a franchise low, and the second-lowest in the league for the season. The Barons lost two of their next three, including a 5–4 win over San Antonio on October 25 in which Omark scored four goals, one of which a successful penalty shot against goaltender Dov Grumet-Morris. It was Omark's second career game with four or more goals.

November

As a result of the continued Edmonton injuries trickle-down effect, the Barons started November with few veterans and nine skaters who had played for the ECHL last season. Oklahoma City suffered their second shutout loss of the season on November 1 with a 6–0 loss to the Chicago Wolves, one of the worst losses in the franchise's four-year history. They responded with a 4–2 victory over Chicago the next day. Goalie Olivier Roy, who was pulled from the net after allowing five goals in the first 21 shots in the first game, made 31 saves in the rematch. Lander was reassigned to the Barons after Ryan Hamilton was reactivated by the Oilers. Oklahoma City struggled with inconsistency problems due to the turnover with Edmonton: they had scored an average of about four goals in their five wins of the season thus far, but only about 1.1 in their seven losses. The Oilers signed a goaltender Ilya Bryzgalov to a $1.7 million contract on November 8, and he began practicing with the Barons. Goalie Tyler Bunz made 34 saves in his first AHL start against San Antonio on November 9, but the team fell 3–2 after the Rampage scored two shootout goals and only Ryan Hamilton scored for Oklahoma City. The Barons defeated San Antonio by the same score on November 12, with Omark getting the game-winner after sliding the pick behind his back and between his legs before scoring against goalie Jacob Markström. The goal generated a great deal of attention, becoming the most-viewed video on the Oklahoma City Barons website with over 75,000 views in the first 24 hours, and making ESPN SportsCenter's top ten plays, a rarity for the AHL.

Bryzgalov made his AHL debut on November 15 in a 5–4 loss against the Abbotsford. He allowing five goals on 24 shots, including two goals within 59 seconds of each other. Center Ben Street recorded a hat-trick against Oklahoma City, with two of his three goals scored 27 seconds apart. Bryzgalov fared better the next day, making 25 saves in a 4–1 win over the Heat. Forward C. J. Stretch scored two goals for the Barons to help end Abbotsford's nine-game winning streak, the longest in the league. Arcobello was returned to the Barons by Edmonton, who in turn recalled both Bryzgalov and Klefbom. Oklahoma City started a five-game road trip with a 6–1 loss against San Antonio, with Martin Marinčin scoring the team's only goal in 37 shots. Bunz was replaced by goaltender Laurent Brossoit, acquired in a recent trade from the Calgary Flame, after allowing the first four goals against.

Standings

Conference standings

Schedule and results

Player statistics

Skaters
Note: GP = Games played; G = Goals; A = Assists; Pts = Points; +/− = Plus/minus; PIM = Penalty minutes
Updated as of November 20, 2013 

†Denotes player spent time with another team before joining team. Stats reflect time with the team only.
‡Left the team mid-season
*Rookie

Goaltenders
Note: GP = Games played; TOI = Time on ice; W = Wins; L = Losses; GA = Goals against; GAA = Goals against average; SV = Saves; SA = Shots against; SV% = Save percentage; SO = Shutouts; G = Goals; A = Assists; PIM = Penalty minutes
Updated as of November 20, 2013

‡Left the team mid-season
*Rookie

Milestones

References

Oklahoma
Oklahoma City Barons
Oklahoma
Oklahoma
Oklahoma